The Department of Arizona was a military department of the United States Army that existed from 1870 to 1893.  It was subordinate to the Military Division of the Pacific and comprised posts in Arizona and Southern California.  It was the successor to the District of Arizona within the Department of California.  It was headquartered at Drum Barracks in Wilmington, California.

Commanders
 Colonel George Stoneman, May 3, 1870, to June 4, 1871
 Lieutenant Colonel George Crook, June 4, 1871, to Mar. 22, 1875 
 ?    Mar. 22, 1875 - Mar. 5, 1878
 Brigadier General Orlando B. Willcox, Mar. 5, 1878, to September 4, 1882
 Brigadier General George Crook, September 4, 1882 to April 11, 1886 
 Brigadier General Nelson A. Miles, April 11, 1886 -  November 26, 1888
 ?  November 26, 1888 - September 16, 1890
 Brigadier General Alexander McDowell McCook, September 16, 1890 to July 6, 1893

Posts
 Fort Breckenridge 1857–1861, Fort Stanford 1862, Camp Wright 1865, Camp Grant 1865-1873
 Fort Mojave 1858–1861, 1863–1890
 Fort Bowie, 1862–1894
 Fort Cerro 1863 - ?
 Camp on the Colorado River, Camp Colorado 1864 - 1871, near Parker
 Yuma Depot 1864 - 1891
 Camp Devin, renamed Camp Toll Gate until 1870, Camp Hualpai, 1869 - 1873, near Paulden

References
 

Arizona